This is a bibliography of books by or about the director and actor Orson Welles.

Books by Orson Welles

Shakespeare studies
 Hill, Roger and Welles, Orson (eds.). Everybody's Shakespeare. Woodstock, Illinois: Todd Press, 1934. (omnibus volume and three separate volumes, with abridged and annotated scripts of The Merchant of Venice, Julius Caesar and Twelfth Night)
 Welles, Orson, and Hill, Roger (eds.). The Mercury Shakespeare. New York: Harper & Row, 1939. (revised version of the above; omnibus volume and three separate volumes, with abridged and annotated scripts of The Merchant of Venice, Julius Caesar and Twelfth Night)
 Welles, Orson, and Hill, Roger (eds.). The Mercury Shakespeare: Macbeth. New York: Harper & Row, 1941.

Scripts and screenplays

Plays
 Welles, Orson. Miracle à Hollywood, et À Bon Entendeur. Paris: Gallimard, 1952. (two plays, [The Unthinking Lobster, and Fair Warning], only published in French)
 Welles, Orson. Moby Dick—Rehearsed. London: Samuel French, Inc., 1965.   (play).
 France, Richard (ed.), Welles, Orson. Orson Welles on Shakespeare: The W.P.A. and Mercury Theatre Playscripts. New York: Greenwood Press, 1990.  (scripts of 1930s Welles abridgments of Macbeth, Julius Caesar and Five Kings)
 Tarbox, Todd (ed.); Hill, Roger and Welles, Orson. Marching Song: A Play. Lanham, Maryland: Rowman & Littlefield, 2019.  (first publication of an unperformed play, written in 1932)

Radio plays
 Welles, Orson. His Honor—The Mayor. New York: The Free Company, 1941. (script of radio play broadcast April 6, 1941)

Screenplays
 Fry, Nicholas (ed.), Welles, Orson. The Trial. London: Lorrimer, 1970. (screenplay, first published in French by l’Avant scene du cinema in 1963)
Kael, Pauline, Mankiewicz, Herman J. and Welles, Orson. The Citizen Kane Book. Boston: Little, Brown and Company, 1971.   (screenplay prefaced by Kael's essay "Raising Kane")
 Comito, Terry (ed.), Welles, Orson. Touch of Evil. New Brunswick, New Jersey: Rutgers University Press, 1985 (screenplay).
 Pepper, James and Rosenbaum, Jonathan (eds.), Welles, Orson, and Kodar, Oja. The Big Brass Ring. Santa Barbara, California: Santa Teresa Press, 1987.  (unproduced screenplay)
 Gellert Lyons, Bridget (ed.) Welles, Orson. Chimes at Midnight. New Brunswick, New Jersey: Rutgers University Press, 1988. (screenplay)
 Pepper, James and Rosenbaum, Jonathan (eds.), Welles, Orson. The Cradle Will Rock. Santa Barbara, California: Santa Teresa Press, 1994.  (unproduced screenplay)
 Gosetti, Giorgio (ed.), Welles, Orson and Kodar, Oja. The Other Side of the Wind.  Locarno, Switzerland: Cahiers du cinéma/ Locarno Film Festival, 2005. (screenplay of a film which was incomplete at the time of publication - subsequently completed in 2018)

Novels and short stories
 Welles, Orson and others. The Lives of Harry Lime. London: Pocket Books, 1952. (short stories)
 Welles, Orson. Une Grosse Légume. Paris: Gallimard, 1953. (novel ghostwritten by Maurice Bessy, only published in French)
 Welles, Orson. Mr. Arkadin. Paris: Gallimard, 1954. (novel ghostwritten by Maurice Bessy, subsequently translated into English)

Interviews
 Rosenbaum, Jonathan (ed.), Welles, Orson and Bogdanovich, Peter. This is Orson Welles. New York: HarperCollins, 1992.  (revised and expanded in 1998)
 Estrin, Mark W. (ed.), Welles, Orson. Orson Welles Interviews. Jackson, Mississippi: University Press of Mississippi, 2002.

Conversations
 Tarbox, Todd. Orson Welles and Roger Hill: A Friendship in Three Acts. Albany, Georgia: BearManor Media, 2013. 
 Biskind, Peter (ed.), Jaglom, Henry. My Lunches With Orson: Conversations Between Henry Jaglom and Orson Welles. New York: Metropolitan Books (Henry Holt and Company), 2013.

Artwork
 Welles, Orson. Les Bravades. New York: Workman, 1996. 
 Braund, Simon (ed). Orson Welles portfolio: Sketches and drawings from the Welles estate. Titan Books, 2019.

Books about Orson Welles

Biographies
 Bessy, Maurice. Orson Welles: An investigation into his films and philosophy. Crown, 1971. (abridged translation of French-language biography, first published in Paris in 1963)
 Brady, Frank. Citizen Welles: A Biography of Orson Welles. New York: Charles Scribner's Sons, 1989. 
 Callow, Simon. Orson Welles: The Road to Xanadu. London: Jonathan Cape, 1995; New York: Viking, 1996.  (biography covering 1915–41)
 __. Orson Welles, Volume 2: Hello Americans. London: Jonathan Cape, 2006; New York: Viking, 2006.  (biography covering 1941–47)
 __. Orson Welles, Volume 3: One-Man Band. London: Jonathan Cape, 2015; New York: Viking, 2016.  (biography covering 1947–65)
 __. Orson Welles, Volume 4. (forthcoming 2019 biography covering 1965–85)
 Feeney, F. X. Orson Welles: Power, Heart and Soul. Raleigh, North Carolina: The Critical Press, 2015. 
 Fowler, Roy Alexander. Orson Welles: A First Biography. London: Pendulum Publications, 1946.
 Heylin, Clinton. Despite the System: Orson Welles Versus the Hollywood Studios. Chicago Review Press, 2005. 
 Higham, Charles. Orson Welles: The Rise and Fall of an American Genius. New York: St. Martin's Press, 1985. 
 Leaming, Barbara. Orson Welles. New York: Viking, 1985. 
 McBride, Joseph. Orson Welles. Harcourt Brace, 1977.
 McGilligan, Patrick. Young Orson: The Years of Luck and Genius on the Path to Citizen Kane. New York: HarperCollins, 2015.  
 Noble, Peter. The Fabulous Orson Welles. London: Hutchinson and Co., 1956. 
 Thomson, David. Rosebud: The Story of Orson Welles. New York: Vintage, 1997. 
 Valentinetti, Claudio M. Orson Welles. Florence: La Nuova Italia, 1980. 
 Visdei, Anca. Orson Welles. Éditions de Fallois, 2015. 
 Whaley, Bart. Orson Welles: the man who was magic. Ebook, 2011.

Studies of Citizen Kane (1941)
 Berthomé, Jean-Pierre and Thomas, François. Citizen Kane. Paris: Flammarion, 1992. 
 Carringer, Robert. The Making of Citizen Kane. Berkeley: University of California Press, 1985.
 Gottesman, Ronald (ed.). Focus on Citizen Kane. Englewood Cliffs, New Jersey: Prentice-Hall, 1971.
 __. Perspectives on Citizen Kane. New York: G.K. Hall/Macmillan, 1996.
 Joxe, Sandra, Citizen Kane, Orson Welles. Paris : Hatier, 1990. 
 Kael, Pauline (ed.). The Citizen Kane Book. New York: Little, Brown and Company, 1971.
 Lebo, Harlan. Citizen Kane: The Fiftieth Anniversary Album. New York: Doubleday, 1990.
 . Citizen Kane: A Filmmaker’s Journey. New York: WGI Publishing, 2000.
 . Citizen Kane: A Filmmaker’s Journey. New York: Thomas Dunne Books, 2016. 
 Merryman, Richard. Mank. The Wit, World and Life of Herman Mankiewicz. New York: William Morrow and Company, 1978.
 Mulvey, Laura. Citizen Kane. London: BFI, 1992.
 Naremore, James (ed.). Orson Welles's Citizen Kane: a Casebook. Oxford University Press, 2004. 
 Pizzitola, Louis. Hearst over Hollywood: Power, passion and propaganda in the movies. Columbia University Press, 2002. 
 Roy, Jean. Citizen Kane [de] Orson Welles: étude critique. Paris: Nathan, 1989. 
 Walsh, John Evangelist. Walking Shadows: Orson Welles, William Randolph Hearst and Citizen Kane. Madison, Wisconsin: University of Wisconsin Press, 2004.

Studies of other individual Welles films

Too Much Johnson (unfinished, 1938)
 Studer, Massimiliano. Alle origini di Quarto potere. Too Much Johnson: il film perduto di Orson Welles. Milano: Mimesis editore, 2018. (about the unfinished film Too Much Johnson). In Italian language

It's All True (unfinished, 1942)
 Benamou, Catherine L. It's All True: Orson Welles's Pan-American Odyssey. Berkeley: University of California Press, 2007. (about the unfinished film It's All True)

The Magnificent Ambersons (1942)
 Carringer, Robert. The Magnificent Ambersons: a Reconstruction. Berkeley: University of California Press, 1993. 
 Perkins, V. F. The Magnificent Ambersons. London: BFI, 1999.

The Stranger (1946)
 Strobel, Ricarda. Propagandafilm und Melodrama: Untersuchungen zu Alfred Hitchcocks "Lifeboat" und Orson Welles' "The Stranger". Berlin: Eissenschaftler-verlag, 1984.

Othello (1952)
 Del Ministro, Maurizio. Othello di Welles. Rome: Bulzoni, 2000. (about Othello) 
 Mac Liammóir, Micháel. Put Money in Thy Purse: The Making of Orson Welles's Othello. London: Methuen, 1952. (revised edition in 1978)

Don Quixote (unfinished, 1955-73)
 Cobos, Juan, and Esteve Riambau. Don Quijote: páginas del guión cinematográfico de Orson Welles. Madrid: Asociación de Directores de Escena de España, 1992. (about the unfinished film Don Quixote) 
 Sciortino, Sigismondo Domenico. Don Chisciotte e il Cinema (dell')Invisibile. Rome: La Camera Verde, 2013. (about the unfinished film Don Quixote)

Touch of Evil (1957)
 Comito, Terry (ed.). Touch of Evil. New Brunswick, New Jersey: Rutgers University Press, 1985. (screenplay with literary criticism)

The Trial (1962)
 Trias, Jean-Phillipe. Le Procès d'Orson Welles. Paris: Cahiers du cinéma / CNDP, 2005. (about The Trial)

Chimes at Midnight (1965)
 Gellert Lyons, Bridget (ed.) Welles, Orson. Chimes at Midnight. New Brunswick, New Jersey: Rutgers University Press, 1988.
 Riambau, Esteve. Las cosas que hemos visto: Welles y Falstaff. Luces de Gálibo, 2015.

The Deep (unfinished, 1967-70)
 Kovačić, Duško and Rafaelić Daniel. Orson Welles in Hvar

F for Fake (1973)
 Thieme, Claudia. F for Fake and the Growth in Complexity of Orson Welles' Documentary Form. New York: Peter Lang, 1997.

The Other Side of the Wind (unfinished, 1970-6; posthumously completed, 2018)
 Gosetti, Giorgio (ed.). The Other Side of the Wind. Locarno, Switzerland: Cahiers du cinéma/ Locarno Film Festival, 2005. 
 Karp, Josh. Orson Welles's Last Movie: The Making of The Other Side of the Wind. New York: St. Martin's Press, 2015. 
 Yates, Michael. Shoot 'Em Dead: Orson Welles & The Other Side of the Wind. Morrisville, North Carolina: Lulu, 2020.
 Studer, Massimiliano, Orson Welles e la New Hollywood, il caso di The Other Side of The Wind, Mimesis Edizioni, 2021.

Studies of multiple Welles films
 Rosenbaum, Jonathan (trans.), Bazin, André. Orson Welles. Harper and Row, 1978.
 Bogdanovich, Peter. The Cinema of Orson Welles. New York: Film Library of the Museum of Modern Art, 1961.
 Cowie, Peter. The Cinema of Orson Welles. Da Capo Press, 1973.
 Drössler, Stefan, (ed.). The Unknown Orson Welles. Munich: Filmmuseum München/belleville Verlag, 2004. (about Welles's unfinished films; text in three languages)  
 Garis, Robert. The Films of Orson Welles. Cambridge University Press, 2004.
 Gear, Matthew Asprey. At the End of the Street in the Shadow: Orson Welles and the City. Wallflower Press/Columbia University Press, 2016.
 Gottesman, Ronald (ed.). Focus on Orson Welles. Englewood Cliffs, New Jersey: Prentice-Hall, 1976.
 Hel-Guedj, Johan-Frederik. Orson Welles, la règle du faux. Michalon, 1997. 
 Higham, Charles. The Films of Orson Welles. Berkeley: University of California Press, 1970.
 Howard, James. The Complete Films of Orson Welles. Citadel Press, 1991.
 McBride, Joseph. Orson Welles. Da Capo Press, 1996. (heavily revised edition of a 1972 monograph)
 ___. What Ever Happened to Orson Welles? A Portrait of an Independent Career. Kentucky: University Press of Kentucky, 2006.
 Nagel, Elsa. L'Art du Mensonge et de la Vérité: Orson Welles, Le Procès et Une Histoire Immortelle. Paris: L'Harmattan, 1997. (about The Trial, The Immortal Story and F for Fake)  
 Naremore, James. The Magic World of Orson Welles. Urbana, Chicago and Springfield, Illinois: University of Illinois Press, 2015.  (centennial anniversary edition, first published by Oxford University Press in 1978, revised edition published by Southern Methodist University Press in 1989)
 Rasmussen, Randy. Orson Welles: Six Films, Scene by Scene, New York: McFarland, 2006
 Rippy, Marguerite. Orson Welles and the Unfinished RKO Projects: A Postmodern Perspective. Southern Illinois University Press, 2009.

Studies of Welles's theatre work
 Anderegg, Michael. Orson Welles, Shakespeare and Popular Culture. New York: Columbia University Press, 1999.
 France, Richard. The Theatre of Orson Welles. Lewisburg, Pennsylvania: Bucknell University Press, 1977.

Studies of Welles's radio work
 Cantril, Hadley. The Invasion From Mars: A Study in the Psychology of Panic. Princeton: Princeton University Press, 1940. 
 Gallop, Alan. The Martians are coming ! The true story of Orson Welles'1938 panic broadcast. Stroud: Amberley Publishing, 2011. 
 Gosling, John. Waging the War of the Worlds: A history of the 1938 radio broadcast and resulting panic. Jefferson, North Carolina: McFarland, 2009 (including the original script by Howard Koch) 
 Heyer, Paul. The Medium and the Magician: Orson Welles, the Radio Years. Ottawa: Rowman & Littlefield, 2005. 
 Koch, Howard. The Panic Broadcast: The whole story of Orson Welles ' legendary radio show invasion from Mars. New York: Avon, 1970.
 Schwartz, A. Brad. Broadcast Hysteria: Orson Welles's War of the Worlds and the Art of Fake News. New York: Hill & Wang, 2015.

Memoirs prominently featuring Welles
 Anderson, Arthur, An Actor's Odyssey: Orson Welles to Lucky the Leprechaun. Albany: BearManor Media, 2010. . 
 Bond, Dorian. Me and Orson Welles: Travelling Europe with a Hollywood Legend. The History press, 2018. 
 Castle, William, Step Right Up! I'm Gonna Scare the Pants Off America: Memoirs of a B-Movie Mogul. New York: Putnam, 1992. 
 Cotten, Joseph, Vanity will get you somewhere. San Francisco: Mercury House, 1987. 
 Everett, Rupert, Red carpets and other bananas skins. Abacus, 2007. 
 Feder, Chris Welles. In My Father's Shadow: A Daughter Remembers Orson Welles. Algonquin Books of Chapel Hill, 2009. 
 Graver, Gary, with Rausch, Andrew J. Making Movies with Orson Welles; A Memoir. Lanham, Maryland: Scarecrow Press, 2008. 
 Heston, Charlton. In the Arena: An Autobiography. Simon & Schuster, 1995.
 Gómez, Andrés Vicente. El Sueño Loco [A Crazy Dream] (Ayuntamiento de Malaga, Malaga, 2001). 
 Hill, Roger. One man's time and chance: A memoir of eighty years 1895-1975. Woodstock public library, 1977.
 Holiday, Billie with Dufty, William, Lady Sings the Blues. New York: Doubleday, 1956.
 Houseman, John. Run Through: A Memoir. New York: Simon & Schuster, 1972. 
 ___. Front and Center: A Memoir. New York: Simon & Schuster, 1979. 
 ___. Final Dress: A Memoir. New York: Simon & Schuster, 1983.
 ___. Unfinished Business: A Memoir, London: Chatto & Windus, 1986.
 Huston, John. An Open Book. New York, Alfred A. Knopf, 1980. 
 Lindsay-Hogg, Michael. Luck and Circumstance: A Coming of Age in Hollywood, New York and Points Beyond. New York: Alfred A. Knopf, 2011. 
 McCambridge, Mercedes. The Quality of Mercy: An autobiography. New York: Time Books, 1981. 
 Mac Liammóir, Micháel. All for Hecuba: An Irish Theatrical Biography. Dublin: Branden Books, 1967.
 Tasca di Cuto, Alessandro. 'Un Principe in America''. Sellerio Editore, 2004.; English translation, as ''A Prince in America'''. 2011.

Other
 Orson Welles, Cahiers du cinéma, Éditions de l'Étoile, 1986. 
 Anile, Alberto. Orson Welles in Italy. Bloomington: Indiana University Press, 2013. (English translation of book first published in Italian in 2006)
 Beja, Morris, ed. Perspectives on Orson Welles. G. K. Hall, 1995.
 Berg, Chuck and Erskine, Tom (ed.). The Encyclopedia of Orson Welles. Checkmark Books, 2003.
 Berthomé, Jean-Pierre and Thomas, François. Orson Welles at Work. London: Phaidon, 2008. (English translation of book first published in French in 2006)
 Ciment, Michel. "Les Enfants Terribles" in American Film, December 1984. 
 Cobos, Juan. Orson Welles: España como obsesión, Editiones de la Filmoteca, Institut  de Valencià de Cultura, España, 1993. 
 Conrad, Peter. Orson Welles: The Stories of His Life. London: Faber and Faber, 2003.
 D'Angela, Toni (ed.). Nelle terre di Orson Welles. Alessandria: Edizioni Falsopiano, 2004.
 Davies, Anthony. Filming Shakespeare's Plays. Cambridge University Press, 1988.
 Drazin, Charles. In Search of the Third Man. Limelight, 2000.
 Duncan, Paul. Orson Welles: Pocket Essentials. London: Pocket Books, 2000.
 Gilmore, James N. and Gottlieb, Sidney (ed.). Orson Welles in focus: Texts and contexts. Indiana university bloomington, 2018. 
 Gosling, John. "Waging the War of the Worlds". McFarland & Company, Inc, 2009.
 Greene, Graham. The Third Man. London: Faber and Faber, 1991.
 Hormiga, Gustavo (2002). "Orsonwelles, a new genus of giant linyphiid spiders (Araneae) from the Hawaiian Islands". Invertebrate Systematics 16: 369–448.
 Ishaghpour, Youssef. Orson Welles, cinéaste, une caméra visible, éditions de la différence, 2001. (Three volumes)  :
 Volume 1 : Mais notre dépendance à l'image est énorme..., 2001.
 Volume 2 : Les films de la période américaine, 2001.
 Volume 3 : Les Films de la période nomade, 2001.
 Jorgens, Jack J. Shakespeare on Film. Bloomington: Indiana University Press, 1977.
 Müller, Adalberto, Orson Welles: Banda de um homem Só. Azouge, 2015. 
 Naremore, James. "The Trial, the FBI Vs Orson Welles" in Film comment, vol. 27, n° 1, 22–27, 1991 (about FBI files on Welles)
 Riambau, Esteve. Orson Welles: Un España immortal, Editiones de la Filmoteca, Institut  de Valencià de Cultura, España, 1993. 
 Ramón, David. La Santa de Orson Welles, D.R. Universidad Nacional Autonoma de México, 1991. 
 Rosenbaum, Jonathan. "Orson Welles's Essay Films and Documentary Fictions", in Placing Movies. Berkeley: University of California Press, 1995.
 _. "The Battle Over Orson Welles", in Essential Cinema. Baltimore: Johns Hopkins University Press, 2004.
 _. "Orson Welles as Ideological Challenge" in Movie Wars. A Capella Books, 2000.
 _. Discovering Orson Welles. Berkeley: University of California Press, 2007. 
 Shakespeare Bulletin, Volume 23, Number 1, Spring 2005: Special Welles issue.
 Simon, William G., (ed.). "Special Welles issue", in: Persistence of Vision: The Journal of the Film Faculty of the City University of New York; Number 7, 1989.
 Simonson, Robert. "Orson's Shadow Talkback Series Continues May 4 with Welles's Daughter." May 3, 2005.
 Taylor, John Russell. Orson Welles: a Celebration. Pavilion, 1986.
 ___. Orson Welles. Pavilion, 1998.
 Thomas, François. "Orson Welles et le remodelage du texte shakespearien" in Actes des congrès de la Société française Shakespeare 16 | 1998, 171-182   
 Tonguette, Peter Prescott. Orson Welles Remembered: Interviews With His Actors, Editors, Cinematographers and Magicians. New York: McFarland, 2007. 
 Walters, Ben. Welles. London: Haus Publishing, 2004. 
 Whaley, Barton. Orson Welles: The Man Who Was Magic, Lybrary.com, 2005. 
 White, Rob. The Third Man. London: BFI, 2003.
 Wood, Bret. Orson Welles: a Bio-Bibliography. Westport, Connecticut: Greenwood Press, 1990.

Written fiction featuring Welles as a character

Graphic novels
Camus, David and Abadzis, Nick. The Cigar That Fell In Love With a Pipe: Featuring Orson Welles & Rita Hayworth. SelfMadeHero, New York, 2014.

Novellas
 Newman, Kim. Anno Dracula: The Other Side of Midnight. London, 2000. (subsequently integrated into Newman's 2013 novel Johnny Alucard, in a rewritten form)

Novels
 Brown, Robert Dwight. Orson Welles' Lost War of the Worlds Screenplay. New York: Allonymous Books, 2013.
 Chabon, Michael. The Amazing Adventures of Kavalier & Clay. New York: Random House, 2000.
 Ferrario, Davide. Dissolvenza al nero (Fade to Black). Rome, 1994.
 Kaplow, Robert. Me and Orson Welles. San Francisco: MacAdam/Cage, 2003. 
 Newman, Kim. Anno Dracula: Dracula Cha Cha Cha. Avon Books, London, 1998.
 _. Anno Dracula: Johnny Alucard. Titan, London, 2013.

Operas
 Hagen, Daron Orson Rehearsed. (Unpublished, though libretto included with 2021 CD release) 2018.

Plays
 Druxman, Michael B. Orson Welles: A One-Person Play in Two Acts. Createspace, New York, 2011.
 Pendleton, Austin. Orson's Shadow. Dramatists Play Service, New York, 2006.
 Pettigrew, Joel. Mercury Man: The Last Performance of Orson Welles. (Unpublished) 2018.
 Wollman, Chris. The Sacred Beasts. (Unpublished) 2017.

References

External links
 The Mercury Shakespeare at HathiTrust (original from the University of Michigan)

Books about film directors
Bibliographies of people
Works by Orson Welles
Bibliographies of American writers
Bibliographies by writer
bibliography